Amorphous ice (non-crystalline or "vitreous" ice) is an amorphous solid form of water.  Common ice is a crystalline material wherein the molecules are regularly arranged in a hexagonal lattice, whereas  amorphous ice lacks long-range order in its molecular arrangement. Amorphous ice is produced either by rapid cooling of liquid water  (so the molecules do not have enough time to form a crystal lattice), or by compressing ordinary ice at low temperatures.

Although almost all water ice on Earth is the familiar crystalline ice Ih, amorphous ice dominates in the depths of interstellar medium, making this likely the most common structure for H2O in the universe at large.

Just as there are many different crystalline forms of ice (currently more than seventeen are known), there are also different forms of amorphous ice, distinguished principally by their densities.

Amorphous ices have the property of suppressing long-range density fluctuations and are, therefore, nearly hyperuniform. Despite the epithet "amorphous", artificial intelligence has shown that amorphous ices are glasses.

Formation
Amorphous ice may be formed when liquid water is cooled to its glass transition temperature (about 136 K or −137 °C) in milliseconds to prevent the spontaneous nucleation of crystals.

Pressure is another important factor in the formation of amorphous ice, and changes in pressure may cause one form to convert into another.

Cryoprotectants can be added to water to lower its freezing point (like antifreeze) and increase viscosity, which inhibits the formation of crystals. Vitrification without addition of cryoprotectants can be achieved by very rapid cooling. These techniques are used in biology for cryopreservation of cells and tissues.

Forms

Low-density amorphous ice
Low-density amorphous ice, also called LDA, vapor-deposited amorphous water ice or amorphous solid water (ASW) is usually formed in the laboratory by a slow accumulation of water vapor molecules (physical vapor deposition) onto a very smooth metal crystal surface under 120 K. In outer space it is expected to be formed in a similar manner on a variety of cold substrates, such as dust particles.

Melting past its glass transition temperature (Tg) between 120 and 140 K, LDA is more viscous than normal water. Recent studies have shown the viscous liquid stays in this alternative form of liquid water up to somewhere between 140 and 210 K, a temperature range that is also inhabited by ice Ic. LDA has a density of 0.94 g/cm3, less dense than the densest water (1.00 g/cm3 at 277 K), but denser than ordinary ice (ice Ih).

By contrast, hyperquenched glassy water (HGW) is formed by spraying a fine mist of water droplets into a liquid such as propane around 80 K, or by hyperquenching fine micrometer-sized droplets on a sample-holder kept at liquid nitrogen temperature, 77 K, in a vacuum. Cooling rates above 104 K/s are required to prevent crystallization of the droplets. At liquid nitrogen temperature, 77 K, HGW is kinetically stable and can be stored for many years.

Medium-density amorphous ice
Medium-density amorphous ice (MDA) was discovered in 2023. It can be created by shaking regular ice in a small container with centimeter-wide stainless-steel balls at temperatures of –200˚ C. The metal balls produced a shear force on the ice breaking it down into a white powder ice. This was first created by Alexander Rosu-Finsen and his team at University College London.

High-density amorphous ice
High-density amorphous ice (HDA) can be formed by compressing ice Ih at temperatures below ~140 K. At 77 K, HDA forms from ordinary natural ice at around 1.6 GPa and from LDA at around 0.5 GPa (approximately 5,000 atm). At this temperature, it can be recovered back to ambient pressure and kept indefinitely. At these conditions (ambient pressure and 77 K), HDA has a density of 1.17 g/cm3.

Peter Jenniskens and David F. Blake demonstrated in 1994 that a form of high-density amorphous ice is also created during vapor deposition of water on low-temperature (< 30 K) surfaces such as interstellar grains. The water molecules do not fully align to create the open cage structure of low-density amorphous ice. Many water molecules end up at interstitial positions. When warmed above 30 K, the structure re-aligns and transforms into the low-density form.

Very-high-density amorphous ice
Very-high-density amorphous ice (VHDA) was discovered in 1996 by Osamu Mishima who observed that HDA became denser if warmed to 160 K at pressures between 1 and 2 GPa and has a density of 1.26 g/cm3 at ambient pressure and temperature of 77 K. More recently it was suggested that this denser amorphous ice was a third amorphous form of water, distinct from HDA, and was named VHDA.

Amorphous ice in the Solar System

Properties
In general, amorphous ice can form below ~130 K. At this temperature, water molecules are unable to form the crystalline structure commonly found on Earth. Amorphous ice may also form in the coldest region of the Earth's atmosphere, the summer polar mesosphere, where noctilucent clouds exist. These low temperatures are readily achieved in astrophysical environments such as molecular clouds, circumstellar disks, and the surfaces of objects in the outer solar system. In the laboratory, amorphous ice transforms into crystalline ice if it is heated above 130 K, although the exact temperature of this conversion is dependent on the environment and ice growth conditions. The reaction is irreversible and exothermic, releasing 1.26–1.6 kJ/mol.

An additional factor in determining the structure of water ice is deposition rate. Even if it is cold enough to form amorphous ice, crystalline ice will form if the flux of water vapor onto the substrate is less than a temperature-dependent critical flux. This effect is important to consider in astrophysical environments where the water flux can be low. Conversely, amorphous ice can be formed at temperatures higher than expected if the water flux is high, such as flash-freezing events associated with cryovolcanism.

At temperatures less than 77 K, irradiation from ultraviolet photons as well as high-energy electrons and ions can damage the structure of crystalline ice, transforming it into amorphous ice. Amorphous ice does not appear to be significantly affected by radiation at temperatures less than 110 K, though some experiments suggest that radiation might lower the temperature at which amorphous ice begins to crystallize.

Detection
Amorphous ice can be separated from crystalline ice based on its near-infrared and infrared spectrum. At near-IR wavelengths, the characteristics of the 1.65, 3.1, and 4.53 μm water absorption lines are dependent on the ice temperature and crystal order. The peak strength of the 1.65 μm band as well as the structure of the 3.1 μm band are particularly useful in identifying the crystallinity of water ice.

At longer IR wavelengths, amorphous and crystalline ice have characteristically different absorption bands at 44 and 62 μm in that the crystalline ice has significant absorption at 62 μm while amorphous ice does not. In addition, these bands can be used as a temperature indicator at very low temperatures where other indicators (such as the 3.1 and 12 μm bands) fail. This is useful studying ice in the interstellar medium and circumstellar disks. However, observing these features is difficult because the atmosphere is opaque at these wavelengths, requiring the use of space-based infrared observatories.

Molecular clouds, circumstellar disks, and the primordial solar nebula
Molecular clouds have extremely low temperatures (~10 K), falling well within the amorphous ice regime. The presence of amorphous ice in molecular clouds has been observationally confirmed. When molecular clouds collapse to form stars, the temperature of the resulting circumstellar disk isn't expected to rise above 120 K, indicating that the majority of the ice should remain in an amorphous state. However, if the temperature rises high enough to sublimate the ice, then it can re-condense into a crystalline form since the water flux rate is so low. This is expected to be the case in the circumstellar disk of IRAS 09371+1212, where signatures of crystallized ice were observed despite a low temperature of 30–70 K.

For the primordial solar nebula, there is much uncertainty as to the crystallinity of water ice during the circumstellar disk and planet formation phases. If the original amorphous ice survived the molecular cloud collapse, then it should have been preserved at heliocentric distances beyond Saturn's orbit (~12 AU).

Comets
The possibility of the presence of amorphous water ice in comets and the release of energy during the phase transition to a crystalline state was first proposed as a mechanism for comet outbursts. Evidence of amorphous ice in comets is found in the high levels of activity observed in long-period, Centaur, and Jupiter Family comets at heliocentric distances beyond ~6 AU. These objects are too cold for the sublimation of water ice, which drives comet activity closer to the sun, to have much of an effect. Thermodynamic models show that the surface temperatures of those comets are near the amorphous/crystalline ice transition temperature of ~130 K, supporting this as a likely source of the activity. The runaway crystallization of amorphous ice can produce the energy needed to power outbursts such as those observed for Centaur Comet 29P/Schwassmann–Wachmann 1.

Kuiper Belt objects
With radiation equilibrium temperatures of 40–50 K, the objects in the Kuiper Belt are expected to have amorphous water ice. While water ice has been observed on several objects, the extreme faintness of these objects makes it difficult to determine the structure of the ices. The signatures of crystalline water ice was observed on 50000 Quaoar, perhaps due to resurfacing events such as impacts or cryovolcanism.

Icy moons
The Near-Infrared Mapping Spectrometer (NIMS) on NASA's Galileo spacecraft spectroscopically mapped the surface ice of the Jovian satellites Europa, Ganymede, and Callisto. The temperatures of these moons range from 90–160 K, warm enough that amorphous ice is expected to crystallize on relatively short timescales. However, it was found that Europa has primarily amorphous ice, Ganymede has both amorphous and crystalline ice, and Callisto is primarily crystalline. This is thought to be the result of competing forces: the thermal crystallization of amorphous ice versus the conversion of crystalline to amorphous ice by the flux of charged particles from Jupiter. Closer to Jupiter than the other three moons, Europa receives the highest level of radiation and thus through irradiation has the most amorphous ice. Callisto is the farthest from Jupiter, receiving the lowest radiation flux and therefore maintaining its crystalline ice. Ganymede, which lies between the two, exhibits amorphous ice at high latitudes and crystalline ice at the lower latitudes. This is thought to be the result of the moon's intrinsic magnetic field, which would funnel the charged particles to higher latitudes and protect the lower latitudes from irradiation.

The surface ice of Saturn's moon Enceladus was mapped by the Visual and Infrared Mapping Spectrometer (VIMS) on the NASA/ESA/ASI Cassini space probe. The probe found both crystalline and amorphous ice, with a higher degree of crystallinity at the "tiger stripe" cracks on the surface and more amorphous ice between these regions. The crystalline ice near the tiger stripes could be explained by higher temperatures caused by geological activity that is the suspected cause of the cracks. The amorphous ice might be explained by flash freezing from cryovolcanism, rapid condensation of molecules from water geysers, or irradiation of high-energy particles from Saturn.

Earth's polar mesosphere
Ice clouds form at and below the Earth's high latitude mesopause (~90 km) where temperatures have been observed to fall as to below 100 K.  It has been suggested that homogeneous nucleation of ice particles results in low density amorphous ice. Amorphous ice is likely confined to the coldest parts of the clouds and stacking disordered ice I is thought to dominate elsewhere in these polar mesospheric clouds.

Uses
Amorphous ice is used in some scientific experiments, especially in cryo-electron microscopy of biomolecules. The individual molecules can be preserved for imaging in a state close to what they are in liquid water.

See also
 Formation and evolution of the Solar System
 Interstellar ice

References

External links
Discussion of amorphous ice at LSBU's website.
Glass transition in hyperquenched water from Nature (requires registration)
Glassy Water from Science, on phase diagrams of water (requires registration)
AIP accounting discovery of VHDA
HDA in space
Computerized illustrations of molecular structure of HDA

Forms of water
Water ice
Amorphous solids